Maulvi Abdul Khaliq Abid is an Afghan Taliban politician who is currently serving as Deputy Governor of Zabul Province since 7 November 2021. He has also served as Governor of Nimruz Province from August 2021 to 6 November 2021.

References

Living people
Taliban governors
Governors of Nimruz Province
Year of birth missing (living people)